The 2021 United Kingdom census is the 23rd official census of the United Kingdom. Beginning in 1801, they have been recorded every 10 years. The decadal 2021 censuses of England, Wales, and Northern Ireland took place on 21 March 2021, and the census of Scotland took place 365 days later on 20 March 2022. The censuses were administered by the Office for National Statistics (ONS) in England and Wales, by the Northern Ireland Statistics and Research Agency (NISRA) in Northern Ireland, and by the National Records of Scotland in Scotland. These were the first British censuses for which most of the data was gathered online. Two of them went ahead despite the COVID-19 pandemic, in part because the information obtained would assist government and public understanding of the pandemic's impact. The census-taking in Scotland was postponed, and took place in 2022because of the pandemic.

The censuses in 2021 and 2022 follows on from Beyond 2011, a project by the UK Statistics Authority to assess the value, cost, and alternatives to a census in 2021. The project recommended a census in 2021, and amongst other organisations, suggested it be run online.

Initial results for England and Wales were released on 28 June 2022. Results for Scotland are expected to be realised in March 2023.

Background 

After the 2011 census, both the UK coalition government and the main opposition party, Labour, expressed concerns about the rising costs of the decadal census. There were also concerns about the value of continuing with the traditional approach adopted for the 2011 census. This included whether collection methods were still fit for purpose in a rapidly changing society and whether census outputs, based on a survey conducted every ten years, would continue to meet the increasingly demanding needs of public and private sector users. Emerging technological developments were seen as providing alternative and improved data gathering opportunities. These concerns and opportunities led the UK Government to question if a supplementary or wholly alternative approach to the traditional 10-yearly census was required; more frequent, possibly annual, small-scale surveys could be employed instead.

In 2011, The Beyond 2011 Programme was established to look at alternatives to the traditional census approach. The UK Statistics Authority coordinated the project which was also undertaken by its counterparts in the devolved administrations of Scotland and Northern Ireland.

In 2014, the UK Statistics Authority announced the recommendation from the Beyond 2011 Programme that there should be a decennial-style 2021 census in England and Wales, which in contrast with earlier censuses, would be conducted predominantly through online completion of census forms, supplemented by the further use of administrative and survey data. Existing census gathering methods would be used only as an alternative, where online methods are not feasible. A parallel announcement for Scotland's 2021 census was made by the National Records for Scotland. The ONS Director, Population and Demography Statistics was reported as saying that an estimated 60–65% of household returns would be completed online.

In April 2014, the British House of Commons Public Accounts Committee (PAC) concluded in its report Too soon to scrap the Census, that the 2021 census should go ahead. It has reservations over the lack of investigation into the options for using administrative data and encouraged the UK Government to reassure the public about privacy concerns.

The Minister for the Cabinet Office welcomed the recommendations for a predominantly online 2021 census for England and Wales supplemented by the use of governmental and other administrative data in a letter to the National Statistician in July 2014. He made clear that the Government saw the dual-running decennial national census with administrative data gathering option as a transitional approach and asked the National Statistician to ensure sufficient research is undertaken both prior to and after the 2021 census to find and validate alternative methods to replace the traditional national census and intermediate surveying approach.

Legislation 

Under the Census Act 1920, it is for the United Kingdom Government and Parliament to determine  the arrangements for census-taking in England and Wales. Parallel legislative procedures will be required in the devolved administrations of Scotland and Northern Ireland. It would be late 2015 at the earliest before regulations were made. Subject to this legislation being passed the census would be conducted on the same day in England and Wales, Scotland and Northern Ireland to ensure coherence and consistency. There is a legal requirement to complete the 2011 census questionnaire, under the terms of the Census Act 1920. As at 21 March 2021 everyone who had lived or intended to live in the country for three months or more was required to complete a questionnaire. Failure to return a completed questionnaire could lead to a fine and criminal record.

In Scotland, the Census (Amendment) (Scotland) Act 2019 made provisions for voluntary questions about transgender status and sexual orientation to be asked. The Census (Return Particulars and Removal of Penalties) Act 2019 makes the same provision for England and Wales. The sexual orientation question would also be asked in Northern Ireland.

Religion 

The campaign 'If you're not religious, say so!' by Humanists UK aimed to change the wording of the census question on religion. This campaign encouraged non-religious people to tick 'no religion' in order to create a more accurate portrayal of religiousness in the UK.
Another campaign by the Climate Census campaign group suggested writing in 'Climate concerned' in response to the religion question, to demand climate action from the government.

Legal challenge to 'What is your Sex' guidance 
	
On 9 March 2021, a High Court judge ordered that the census online guidance accompanying the 'What is your Sex?' question (in the England and Wales Census and the Northern Ireland Census) should be amended. The order followed a legal campaign by the campaign group Fair Play for Women.
	
Fair Play for Women argued that guidance on the online question was unlawful because it allowed people to use the sex listed on their passport, which can be changed without the person applying for a Gender Recognition Certificate under the Gender Recognition Act 2004. The group said this could lead to 'self-identification' which could distort the data. Some academics criticised what they said was the ONS's confusion between the concepts of sex and gender identity. Other academics supported the design of the census questions. The Office for National Statistics said it would update the guidance for people to use sex on birth certificates or gender recognition certificates.
	
On 17 March 2021, the ONS withdrew from the High Court proceedings, conceding that "what is your sex" refers to sex as recognised by the law, and not gender identity.
	
In August 2021, National Records of Scotland issued guidelines regarding the Scottish Census that allow the answer given by a transgender person to the "What is your sex?" question to differ from what is on their birth certificate.  In response, the Office for Statistics Regulation, a UK-wide watchdog, wrote to National Records of Scotland to question the guidelines.

In November 2021, the Murray Blackburn Mackenzie (MBM) policy collective claimed that documents obtained via the Freedom of Information Act showed that the Equality and Human Rights Commission put "extreme external pressure" on Scottish civil servants including chief statistician Roger Halliday to amend their initial proposals. Fair Play For Women was considering legal action to ensure that census guidance asks for responses to be according to birth certificate or gender recognition certificate.

In December 2021, Fair Play for Women initiated a judicial review of National Records of Scotland guidance regarding the "what is your sex" question. Their advocate is Roddy Dunlop, dean of the Faculty of Advocates. Lord Sandison dismissed the case on 17 February 2022 stating that there was "no general rule or principle of law that a question as to a person's sex may only properly be answered by reference to the sex stated on that person's birth certificate or GRC".

 An appeal by Fair Play for Women was refused by the Inner House of the Court of Session.

Coordination 

The UK Statistics Authority has the responsibility for coordinating the census arrangements across the United Kingdom through the Office for National Statistics (ONS), which is also responsible for the census in England and Wales.

2021 census research 

The 2011 UK census was the first decennial census in the United Kingdom to include the option of completing the census documentation online. Across the UK between 15 and 19% of census forms were submitted online. The UK Statistics Authority proposed that the 2021 census should be conducted predominantly online (with support provided for those unable to complete the census online), supplemented by the use of administrative and survey data and improve annual statistics between censuses. For the census in 2021 the proposed target for online completion has been set to at least 65%.

Research has been under way since 2011 to design a new census methodology which maximises the success of an online approach.

Research commissioned by the Beyond 2011 programme identified that there were risks associated with over-reliance on administrative data drawn from governmental department sources due to process changes, such as benefits and welfare payments and the necessity to include full access to statistical data as part as proposed legislation affecting administrative programmes. Issues identified also included the accuracy of administrative data sets for geographical areas below that of local authorities, problems associated with estimation and the use of address registers. ONS on behalf of the UK Statistics Authority has taken on board the recommendations of the Skinner Report into methodology work and has proposed three research strands to determine the 'optimum blend' of online census, administrative data and surveying methods for the 2021 census and indeed subsequent censuses.

The UK Statistics Authority has commissioned research strands as part of a Census transformation programme which was due to report by 2017 relating to the 2021 census operation, the shape of population statistics in 2021, and the shape of population statistics beyond 2021 in the lead up to 2031.

Census work programme 

A work programme running until 2024, comprising eight phases, was developed by ONS.
 Research (ended March 2015)
 Design and prototyping (ended December 2016)
 Testing (2017)
 Development (2018)
 Rehearsal (January 2019 – June 2020)
 Collection operations (July 2020 – December 2021)
 Analysis, output and dissemination (2022–23)
 Evaluation / future planning (2023–24)

Alongside this programme trials of statistics generation using administrative data were planned starting from the autumn of 2015 and running through to 2021 with the aim of ranging across the breadth, detail and accuracy of census outputs.

Production 

The contract for preparing, dispatching up to 16 million paper questionnaire packs (for anyone who did not want to, or could not access the census online), and then securely managing, capturing and digitising the responses was awarded to Leidos Innovations UK. The contract was estimated to be worth around £65.1m. The parent company of Leidos Innovations UK, Leidos (an American defence, aviation, information technology, and biomedical research company), merged with Lockheed Martin's IT sector in August 2016. Lockheed Martin UK was awarded the contract for the census in 2011.
Adecco UK was contracted by ONS to recruit, train and administer the pay for the 30,000 temporary ONS workers who would be working as field staff for the 2021 census.

Changes from 2011 census 

The general style of the questionnaire is similar to that of the 2011 census, although there were some new questions for 2021:

 Are the respondents ex-armed forces?
 Voluntary question for 16 and over about sexual orientation.
 Voluntary question for 16 and over: Is the gender you identify with the same as your sex registered at birth? This is in addition to the compulsory question about respondents' sex.

Advertising 

An advertising campaign (made under contract by M&C Saatchi) was launched under the slogan of "it's about us" at the start of 2021. Television adverts have tried to show a diverse range of people in various locations in England and Wales in front of a purple fabric screen, with a cover version of The Zombies' "This Will Be Our Year", performed by Jose McGill & The Vagaband, featuring as the advert soundtrack.

2021 Census for Northern Ireland 

The Northern Ireland Statistics and Research Agency (NISRA) undertakes the census in Northern Ireland.

The NISRA has published a report reviewing the 2011 census and other online-orientated censuses abroad and identified the importance of such things as pre-census publicity, the use of a unique internet code or ePin, and a coordinated promotion and follow up process during the census completion period.

2022 Census for Scotland 

The National Records of Scotland (NRS) is responsible for the census in Scotland. A rehearsal was conducted on 7 October 2019 and closed for returns on 7 November 2019 in three local authority areas: parts of Glasgow City, Dumfries and Galloway and Na h-Eileanan Siar.

The census was scheduled to take place on 21 March 2021, but was delayed in July 2020 by the Scottish Government because of the COVID-19 pandemic. 

The Scottish Government has come under criticism for the way the census has been conducted, with some news outlets describing the results as being 'botched' due to record low turnout rates and failing to meet the set target return rate of 94%. Initial turnout rates for the census in Scotland concluded with 79% return rate; an additional round of extension to filling out the census was granted to encourage returns, raising the return rate percentage to 89%. The return rate for comparison in England and Wales was 97%. However national statistician Ian Diamond has said that despite meeting the target, the census could still "really good data". The additional round of extension cost the Scottish Government an additional £6m, and £148m in total.

Censuses in Crown Dependencies 

Although it is a Crown Dependency, and not part of the United Kingdom, Jersey carried out a census on the same day as the 2021 UK census.

Guernsey no longer carries out a decennial census, instead using the Rolling Electronic Census Project to produce regular census reports.

The Isle of Man also undertook a full census in 2021 (having held an interim census in 2016).

Results

England and Wales
Initial results, released in June 2022, showed the recorded population of England and Wales to be 59,597,300 (56,489,800 in England and 3,107,500 in Wales), a rise of 6.3% or 3.5 million people over the previous decade. This was the largest population ever recorded through a census in England and Wales, and the overall population of the United Kingdom was estimated to be 67 million. The census also showed that the population of the two countries aged 65 and over had surpassed the number of children aged 15 and under for the first time, with 11.1 million people aged 65 and over compared with 10.4 million aged under 15.

Results of the question on religion were published on 29 November 2022. The question was voluntary but was answered by 94.0% of the population of England and Wales. 46.2% of the population described themselves as "Christian", 6.5% as "Muslim", and 1.7% as "Hindu". 37.2% of the population asserted that they had "no religion". In Wales, there were more people declaring that they had "no religion" (47%) than those affirming a Christian identity or any other religion.

Results on sexual orientation and gender identity questions were released on 6 January 2023. Similarly to the religion question, this question was voluntary but was answered by 92.5% of the population of England and Wales. 89.4% of the population described themselves as straight or heterosexual. 1.5% described themselves as "Gay or lesbian", 1.3% as "Bisexual" and 0.3% were described as having "[an]other sexual orientation" (with the most common being pansexual, asexual and queer). The remaining 7.5% did not answer. 0.54% answered 'No' to the census question 'Is the gender you identify with the same as your sex registered at birth?'

See also 
 Census in the United Kingdom
 Demography of the United Kingdom

References

External links 

 Census 2021 – Office of National Statistics website for the 2021 census

 
2021 in the United Kingdom
2021
United Kingdom
Articles containing video clips